Henry Wickham may refer to:

 Sir Henry Wickham (explorer) (1846–1928), British explorer
 Henry Lewis Wickham (1789–1864), Receiver General of Gibraltar and principal private secretary to Lord Althorp
 Henry T. Wickham (1849–1943), American lawyer and politician in the Virginia Senate
 Henry Wickham Wickham (1800–1876), British Conservative party politician